St. Paul's Cathedral, also known as Incheon Cathedral and Dapdong Cathedral, is a Roman Catholic Cathedral located in Incheon, South Korea's third largest City.

The Church was designed by Fr. Eugene Cost (of the Paris Foreign Missions Society) in a mixture of styles, including Neo-Gothic and Neo-Romanesque.

The Latin rite Church serves as the seat of the Diocese of Incheon (Dioecesis Inchonensis or 인천 교구) which was created in 1962 by Pope John XXIII.

See also
Roman Catholicism in South Korea

References

Roman Catholic cathedrals in South Korea
Buildings and structures in Incheon